James Idwal Jones (30 June 1900 – 18 October 1982) was a Welsh, Labour Party politician.

He was born in Rhosllannerchrugog, Wrexham, and educated at Ruabon Grammar School and Normal College, Bangor. He became a teacher in 1922 in Holt, but then moved to positions in Glyn Ceiriog and Penycae. In 1938, he was appointed as headmaster at Grango School in his home village of Rhosllannerchrugog.

He first stood as a Labour Parliamentary candidate in 1951 for the Denbigh constituency, but was unsuccessful. He was elected at a by-election in March 1955 following the death of the sitting Labour MP Robert Richards. Jones held the seat at the general election in May 1955, and at subsequent elections until he retired from the House of Commons at the 1970 general election.

He died at Ponciau, Wrexham, aged 82.

He was the brother of Thomas Jones, Baron Maelor, Member of Parliament for Merioneth from 1951 to 1966.

See also 
 1955 Wrexham by-election

References

External links 
 

1900 births
1982 deaths
Welsh Labour Party MPs
UK MPs 1951–1955
UK MPs 1955–1959
UK MPs 1959–1964
UK MPs 1964–1966
UK MPs 1966–1970
People from Rhosllanerchrugog
Politics of Wrexham
People educated at Ruabon Grammar School